Helder Aragão, better known as DJ Dolores, is a Brazilian DJ.

Helder Aragão was one of the participants of the mangue movement, as a designer. The crabs with brains that decorate the first release of the mangue movement were created by him. Plugged into electronic music Helder, renamed DJ Dolores, began creating his sound at the end of 1990s. Soon after came the Orchestra Santa Massa, who melded grooves with regional rhythms. The group soon gained national and world notoriety.

Discography
Aparelhagem (2005)
1 Real (2008)

Scoring credits
 O Rap do Pequeno Príncipe Contra as Almas Sebosas, 2000
 Narradores de Javé, 2003 
 A Máquina, 2005 
 Critico, 2008
 Neighboring Sounds, 2012
 Tatuagem, 2013

References

External links
Official website
 

Living people
People from Sergipe
Brazilian DJs
Year of birth missing (living people)